Henohenomoheji or hehenonomoheji is a face known to be drawn by Japanese schoolchildren using hiragana characters. It became a popular drawing during the Edo period.

The word breaks down into seven hiragana characters: he, no, he, no, mo, he, and ji. The first two he are the eyebrows, the two no are the eyes, the mo is a nose, and the last he is the mouth. The outline of the face is made by the character ji, its two short strokes (dakuten) forming the ear or cheek. Henohenomoheji is often used to symbolize a nondescript or generic human face, such as the faces of kakashi (scarecrows) and teru teru bōzu.

See also
ASCII art
Cool S
Emoticon
Tête à Toto

References

External links

 

Japanese word games
Doodling motifs